Kitty Empire is the pen name of a British writer and music critic, currently writing for The Observer.

Early life
Empire says that she was born in Montreal, Quebec in 1970 and brought up in Canada, Italy and Egypt before arriving in Britain in 1988. 
She studied at Wadham College, Oxford and Thames Valley University before working as a stage door-keeper for the Royal Shakespeare Company and London's Barbican Theatre. Empire describes herself as a feminist.

Career
Empire began writing about music at the NME in 1995, continuing for seven years. In 2002, she became pop critic for The Observer. She has also contributed to a variety of publications and broadcasts such as Elle (US), GQ, Radio 4's Woman's Hour, Newsnight Review, Uncut and The Scotsman. In 2008, she served as a judge for the Mercury Music Prize and she is a guest judge for the 2022 Observer / Anthony Burgess Prize for Arts Journalism. Empire also featured on 5Live, BBC 6Music, and BBC2's The Culture Show and Newsnight Review.

Critical reception
Writing in Cambridge University's Popular Music journal, Devon Powers and Tom Perchard describe Empire as "one of the UK's comparatively few broadsheet pop critics, and one of the most insightful." Jennifer Skellington notes that Empire's reviewing style focuses as much upon the artists as their art, and reflects a trend towards "a less conservative approach to rock- and pop-related writing" in the quality press. Educator Mary Hogarth praises Empire's "show, don't tell" approach to writing, her pacing, and her balance of description, perspective, and first-hand experience.

References

External links
 Profile at The Guardian

1970 births
Living people
20th-century pseudonymous writers
21st-century pseudonymous writers
Alumni of the University of West London
Alumni of Wadham College, Oxford
British music critics
British music journalists
British women journalists
Canadian emigrants to the United Kingdom
Canadian music critics
Canadian women music critics
British women music critics
NME writers
Pseudonymous women writers
The Observer people